The 1999 Cup of Russia was the fifth event of six in the 1999–2000 ISU Grand Prix of Figure Skating, a senior-level international invitational competition series. It was held at the Sports and Concert Complex in Saint Petersburg on November 24–28. Medals were awarded in the disciplines of men's singles, ladies' singles, pair skating, and ice dancing. Skaters earned points toward qualifying for the 1999–2000 Grand Prix Final.

Results

Men

Ladies

Pairs

Ice dancing

External links
 1999 Cup of Russia

Cup of Russia
Cup of Russia
Rostelecom Cup